Mahmoud Hamdy Mahmoud Hamouda Attia (born 1 June 1995), also known as El-Wensh, is an Egyptian professional footballer who plays as a centre-back for Egyptian Premier League club Zamalek and the Egypt national team.

In May 2018 he was named in Egypt’s preliminary squad for the 2018 World Cup in Russia.

Career statistics

International
Statistics accurate as of match played 22 January 2022.

International goals
Scores and results list Egypt's goal tally first. Score column indicates score after each Hamdy goal.

Honours

Zamalek

Egyptian Premier League: 2020-21, 2021-22

Egypt Cup: 2017–18, 2018-19 ,2021
Egyptian Super Cup: 2016, 2019–20
Saudi-Egyptian Super Cup: 2018
CAF Confederation Cup: 2018–19
 CAF Super Cup: 2020

References

External links

1995 births
Egyptian footballers
Living people
Tala'ea El Gaish SC players
Zamalek SC players
Egyptian Premier League players
Association football central defenders
2018 FIFA World Cup players
Egypt international footballers
2019 Africa Cup of Nations players
Footballers at the 2020 Summer Olympics
Olympic footballers of Egypt
2021 Africa Cup of Nations players
Future FC (Egypt) players
People from Benha